Men's Slalom World Cup 1980/1981

Calendar

Final point standings
In Men's Slalom World Cup 1980/81 the best 5 results count.

Men's Slalom Team Results
All points were shown including individual deduction. bold indicate highest score - italics indicate race wins

References

World Cup
FIS Alpine Ski World Cup slalom men's discipline titles